Presidential elections were held in Egypt on 5 October 1987. The vote took the form of a referendum on the candidacy of Hosni Mubarak, who had been nominated by the two-thirds required in the People's Assembly on 5 July. Just over 97% of voters voted in favour with an 88.5% turnout.

Results

References

Egypt
President
Egypt
Presidential elections in Egypt
Referendums in Egypt
Single-candidate elections